Vany may refer to:
Vany, France, a town in Moselle, Lorraine, France
Muramoylpentapeptide carboxypeptidase, an enzyme